The University of Arkansas at Pine Bluff (UAPB) is a public historically black university in Pine Bluff, Arkansas. Founded in 1873, it is the second oldest public college or university in the state of Arkansas. UAPB is part of the University of Arkansas System and Thurgood Marshall College Fund.

History

The University of Arkansas at Pine Bluff was authorized in 1873 by the Reconstruction-era legislature as the Branch Normal College and opened in 1875 with Joseph Carter Corbin principal.  A historically black college, it was nominally part of the "normal" (education) department of Arkansas Industrial University, later the University of Arkansas. It was operated separately as part of a compromise to get a college for black students, as the state maintained racial segregation well into the 20th century. (Although the University of Arkansas at Fayetteville was integrated when it opened in 1872, it soon became segregated after the end of Reconstruction and didn't start desegregation until 1948.) It later was designated as a land-grant college under the 1890 federal amendments to Morrill Land-Grant Acts. As Congress had originally established the land grant colleges to provide education to all qualified students in a state, in 1890 it required states maintaining segregated systems to establish a separate land-grant university for blacks as well as whites.

In 1927, the school severed its ties with the University of Arkansas and became Arkansas Agricultural, Mechanical & Normal College (Arkansas AM&N). It moved to its current campus location in 1929.

In the mid-1950s AM&N administrators asked students not to support civil rights causes perceived as radical by Arkansas politicians as they feared getting their funding cut by the state. John B. Pickhart, an alumnus of the University of Arkansas, Fayetteville, wrote that therefore AM&N being in Pine Bluff "might actually have slowed development of an integration movement" for that community.

In 1972, Arkansas AM&N re-joined what is now the University of Arkansas System. As a full-fledged campus with graduate study departments, it gained its current name and university status in the process.

Since 1988, the university has gained recognition as a leading research institution in aquaculture studies, offering the state's only comprehensive program in this field. It supports a growing regional industry throughout the Mid-South (according to the school, aquaculture is a $167 million industry in Arkansas alone and worth approximately $1.2 billion in the Mississippi Delta region). In 2012, the program was enhanced by the addition of an Aquaculture/Fisheries PhD program.

The University of Arkansas at Pine Bluff is the oldest and largest HBCU in Arkansas.

Academics

UAPB is divided into eight academic divisions.
The School of Agriculture, Fisheries, and Human Sciences
The School of Arts and Sciences
The School of Business and Management
The School of Education
Graduate Studies & Continuing Education 
Carolyn F. Blakely Honors Program
Military Science 
University College

UAPB is fully accredited by the Higher Learning Commission.

UAPB has the only comprehensive aquaculture program in Arkansas, established to help support the state's $167 million aquaculture industry.

Since UAPB offers only one engineering degree program (agricultural engineering), it has a partnership with the University of Arkansas at Fayetteville (UA) that allow qualified students to spend three years to complete an engineering related bachelor's degree at UAPB then automatic admissions into UA to complete their engineering bachelor's degree in two years.  Students who successfully complete the UAPB-UA engineering program will have two bachelor's degrees in approximately five years.

In 2019, UAPB established a partnership a with UALR William H. Bowen School of Law.  UAPB students with at least a 3.4 cumulative GPA, minimum 154 LSAT score, and a clean disciplinary record will automatically be admitted.  In addition to being admitted, they will receive a 25 percent tuition scholarship.

University Museum and Cultural Center
The University Museum and Cultural Center on the campus of UAPB contains photographs, catalogs, yearbooks, letters, artifacts, portraits and other ephemera that document the lives and culture of African-Americans who helped shaped the history of UAPB and the Arkansas Delta.  It is the only museum of its kind in Arkansas and was established in 2005.

Athletics 

UAPB's colors are black and gold and their nickname is the Golden Lions.
Arkansas–Pine Bluff's sports teams have participated in NCAA Division I in the Southwestern Athletic Conference (SWAC) since re-joining the conference in 1998, and competes in the Football Championship Subdivision (formerly I-AA) for football. Home football games are held at Golden Lion Stadium. Men's sports also include baseball, basketball, cross country, golf, tennis and track & field; while women's sports include basketball, cross country, soccer, softball, tennis, track & field and volleyball.

Student life

Residential life 

The University of Arkansas at Pine Bluff houses over 1,000 students on campus. Hunt Hall houses male students. The Harrold Complex, consisting of four halls, Johnson, Copeland, Fischer, and Stevens, is for females. Freshman males are assigned to Johnson and Copeland.

Built in 1955, Hunt Hall was named in memory of Silas Hunt, the first black law student at the University of Arkansas at Fayetteville. Hunt Hall has two floors and houses 134 male students.

Built in 1964, the Harrold Complex was named in memory of Norma E. Harrold, former Dean of Women. It has four halls and houses a total of 512 male and female students. Johnson Hall was named in honor of Nettie E. Johnson, a graduate of the class of 1903; Copeland Hall was named in memory of Ernestine Inez Copeland;  Fischer Hall was named in memory of Rubye G. Fischer, a former principal of the J.C. Corbin Laboratory School on campus; and Stevens Hall was named for the late Maggie R. Stevens, a former counselor at Branch Normal College.

The Johnny B. Johnson Complex, JBJ, can house 288 students.

Built in 1991, the Complex was named in honor of Dr. Johnny B. Johnson, former Chancellor of the University of Arkansas at Pine Bluff. JBJ has nine buildings and houses a total of 288 male and female students.

The newest residence hall is the new Delta Housing Complex. Built in 2003, this suite-style complex has 104 private rooms and 140 double rooms; it houses 388 students.

Marching band

In 2008, UAPB's band known as the Marching Musical Machine of the Mid-South (M4), made their debut appearance at the Honda Battle of the Bands.  In 2009, M4 was selected to participate in the United States Presidential Inaugural Parade.

M4 is one of the top three largest collegiate marching bands in Arkansas and is accompanied by two auxiliaries.  The dance auxiliary is known as the "Golden Girls" and the flag auxiliary is known as the "24K Golden Silks."

M4 is a five drum major led marching band.

Fraternities and sororities 
Eight of the nine National Pan-Hellenic Council (NPHC) fraternities and sororities are represented on campus. Less than five percent of the undergraduate student body are represented in the NPHC. The university also hosts four of the seven fraternity and sorority organizations part of the National Interfraternity Music Council (NIMC). These organizations are:

Notable alumni

References

External links

 
Pine Bluff
Universities and colleges in Pine Bluff, Arkansas
University of Alabama at Pine Bluff
Land-grant universities and colleges
University of Arkansas at Pine Bluff
1873 establishments in Arkansas
Educational institutions established in 1873
Buildings and structures in Pine Bluff, Arkansas
Education in Jefferson County, Arkansas
Tourist attractions in Pine Bluff, Arkansas